Tatjana Maria defeated the defending champion Anastasija Sevastova in the final, 6–4, 7–5 to win the singles tennis title at the 2018 Mallorca Open. It was her maiden WTA Tour title.

Seeds

Draw

Finals

Top half

Bottom half

Qualifying

Seeds

Qualifiers

Lucky loser

Draw

First qualifier

Second qualifier

Third qualifier

Fourth qualifier

Fifth qualifier

Sixth qualifier

External links
 Main draw
 Qualifying draw

Mallorca Open - Singles
Singles